Black Refuge EP is the second EP released by Swedish band Junip. It is composed of mostly original songs, but also includes a cover of Bruce Springsteen's "The Ghost of Tom Joad".

Track listing
 "Black Refuge" – 3:25
 "Turn to the Assassin" – 3:36
 "Official" – 6:02
 "Chugga-chugga" – 1:54
 "The Ghost of Tom Joad" (Bruce Springsteen) – 4:11

Personnel
Elias Araya – drums
José González – vocals, guitar
Tobias Winterkorn – organ, Moog synthesizer

References

2005 EPs
Junip albums